Braccialini is a leather accessories company founded in 1954 and based in Florence, Italy. The company operates in 40 countries with 50 mono-brand stores globally.

History
The image of a rose forms the brand's logo because of Carla’s love for flowers. Carla has received the Cavaliere del Lavoro award, assigned to entrepreneurs for their contribution in their chosen field of profession.

Beginnings
Carla and her husband Roberto Braccialini started the company in 1954 as a small workshop with 4 to 5 employees in Florence, Italy. Initially, she started sewing without any formal knowledge with materials such as leather and straw, making clothes and selling them in Versilia. She then slowly moved to create bags with the same materials. Carla sketched the designs, and her husband made the bags and handled the business. The first bag was made with leather and straw, a unique choice at that time. She trained her team to learn the craft and sew. The bags were made to have a playful mood combined with unique designs and new materials.

A flood in 1966 in Florence destroyed all the fabrics and the archives. Carla, with her team, had to start all over.

1980s
In the 1980s, two of Carla’s three sons Riccardo and Massimo joined the company and adopted her philosophy, and carried forth her vision. In 1987 the company entered into many licensing agreements with companies like Vivienne Westwood for the production and distribution of accessories: bags, belts, and small leather items. The following year, in 1988, Contromano, a partner company, was founded. Over the course of a few years, Braccialini entered into licensee agreements with brands like Roccobarocco, Fiorucci, and Bagutta.

1990s
In 1990, Braccialini launched the Tua collection targeted at a younger audience. The first Braccialini boutique was opened in Florence.

2000s
The 2000s was a period of growth for the brand. Braccialini collaborated with the Mariella Burani Fashion Group. Braccialini opened stores in Milan. In 2003 a new mono-brand store opens in Milan followed by boutiques in Rome, London, Dubai in 2004. Also, a licensee agreement with Mariella Burani is established to produce and distribute accessories for them all over the world. In 2005, the first franchisee store in Saudi Arabia and two boutiques in Dubai and Hong Kong are opened. The company acquires a 100% stake in Dadorosa Srl, with a worldwide licensee of Gherardini, 2007 a Florentine brand. The expansion of the brand continues with new stores in Dubai, Paris, and Moscow. Braccialini also enters into more licensing agreements with Frangi Spa controlling the production of foulards, scarves, beachwear and lingerie.

In 2009, Braccialini moved to the new headquarters in Scandicci, Florence. The Feng Shui inspired factory is designed by Chan tit-Kwan from Hong Kong. The new building spreads across 10,000 square meters of space in heart of the leather manufacturing sector of Florence. The external façade is covered by vertical plants and ivy and the internal layout is constructed on the basis of Feng Shui principles. The factory also uses renewable sources of energy like solar panels and recovery of rainwater.

In 2015, a $300-dollar Braccialini car-shaped bag was featured in the 57th Annual Grammy awards. The bag was in the gift basket that all the nominees, presenters, and performers received.

Braccialini today
Today, the company is led by her three sons – Riccardo, Massimo, and Lorenzo who have taken on three different roles in the company. Massimo is the style director, Riccardo the CEO, and Lorenzo the marketing and communication director.
The creative team of designers led by Carla and her son Massimo creates handbags and accessories.

In October 2012 Braccialini announced up to 77 layoffs of 220 employees total but in 2013, after an agreement with the unions, 25 people will leave the Company, due to the externalization of logistics.

See also 
 Italian fashion
 Made in Italy

References

External links 
 

Companies based in Florence
Italian companies established in 1954
Clothing brands of Italy
Clothing companies established in 1954
High fashion brands
Leather manufacturers
Luxury brands
Shoe companies of Italy
Fashion accessory brands
Bags (fashion)